Old Brick House is a historic home located at Elizabeth City, Pasquotank County, North Carolina. It was built about 1750, and is a -story frame dwelling with brick gable ends.  It sits on a raised brick basement, has a gable roof with dormers, and two interior end chimneys with molded caps.  The interior features a richly carved mantel with an elaborate broken ogee pediment.  It is one of the few brick-end buildings in the state.  It is a member of the small group of 18th century frame houses with brick ends in northeast North Carolina; the group includes the Sutton-Newby House and the Myers-White House.

Local legend held that the house was built and first occupied by the pirate Blackbeard, though in reality he had been dead since 1718.

It was listed on the National Register of Historic Places in 1972.

References

External links

 

Historic American Buildings Survey in North Carolina
Houses on the National Register of Historic Places in North Carolina
Houses completed in 1750
Houses in Pasquotank County, North Carolina
National Register of Historic Places in Pasquotank County, North Carolina